Lagoon Hull is a proposed £1.5 billion development on the Humber Estuary foreshore between Hessle and Kingston upon Hull, in the East Riding of Yorkshire, England. The proposed lagoon would be formed from a stone causeway and will provide an outer lock gate in the Humber Estuary which would effectively dam the River Hull, making it a non-tidal waterway. The scheme is being vaunted as one that will prevent future flooding in Hull when sea levels rise, and contribute to less flooding in the wider Humber Estuary.

An additional part of the scheme is to create a larger dock area which is protected from wave and tidal action, providing a safe haven for shipping.

History
Severe flooding has affected the City of Hull throughout the 20th and 21st centuries. In the 2013 floods and tidal surge, the barrier at Hull came within centimetres of being overwhelmed, and whilst it prevented major flooding in the city, the Port of Immingham, on the south bank of the estuary, was subjected to flooding.

One of the suggestions to combat this was a barrier across the entire Humber Estuary, which would protect many localities on both sides of the estuary. However, this would need to be four times larger than the Thames Barrier and was costed in 2019 at £10 billion. After the 2013 floods, Members of Parliament and the Local Enterprise Partnership, asked the government for money to shore up the flood defences.

The project for a lagoon was announced in 2019, but had been in development for six years before it was unveiled to the public.

Lagoon proposal
A stone causeway would run from the foreshore at Hessle to Hull docks, creating a lagoon by effectively damming the outlet of the River Hull, which would then become non-tidal. This flood defence is labelled as being good enough to keep the city flood free from tidal surges for 100 years. A study in relation to the 2013 flooding determined that were the lagoon to have been in place, it would afforded the city 100% protection and the wider estuary would have seen a reduction in flooding of 80%.

The proposal for the lagoon includes a new section of dual carriageway, that would connect with the A63 road near to the Humber Bridge, and run along the edge of the lagoon avoiding the centre of Hull, and connecting with the A63, the A1165 and the A1033 in the eastern part of Hull near the docks. The proposal for the causeway will include pedestrian access and a cycle lane. East of the lagoon, a new  outer harbour development would also be created providing ease of access by shipping into the docks, and a completely new dock area, which would be protected from the tides and waves. In 2019, the project was costed at £1.5 billion.

Independent analysis of the project by ABPmer, the University of Hull and the Environment Agency, determined that fears around making flooding worse (or creating flooding elsewhere in the estuary), were unfounded. The causeway would actually contribute to less water entering the estuary during a tidal surge.

If sufficient funding were raised, and planning permission were to be granted, the project could only be delivered after feasibility studies were completed (five to ten years) and then a further five years of building would see the project delivered by 2030 at the earliest.

See also
Bransholme water works, has storage lagoons on the River Hull to regulate the flow of water

Notes

References

Source

Lagoons of the United Kingdom
Flood control in the United Kingdom
Humber